The second season of The Fresh Prince of Bel-Air premiered on September 9, 1991 and concluded on May 4, 1992. In this season, the kitchen and living room sets of the Banks mansion (which is where most scenes were shot) were rebuilt to be larger and more contemporary, as opposed to the more formal style of the first season. They were connected by an archway, allowing scenes to be shot continuously between the sets.

Episodes 

 Will Smith, James Avery, Janet Hubert-Whitten, Alfonso Ribeiro, Karyn Parsons, and Tatyana M. Ali were present for all episodes.
 Joseph Marcell was absent for two episodes.
 DJ Jazzy Jeff appeared in three episodes.
 Vernee Watson-Johnson appeared in three episodes.
 Jenifer Lewis appeared in three episodes.
 Tim Haldeman appeared in two episodes.
 Milton Berle appeared in one episode.
 Zsa Zsa Gabor appeared in one episode.
 Nancy Giles appeared in one episode.
 John Beradino appeared in one episode.
 Tisha Campbell appeared in one episode.
 Marge Kotlisky appeared in one episode.
 Perry Moore appeared in three episodes.
 Joan McMurtrey appeared in one episode.
 Tina Lifford appeared in one episode.

Cast
 Will Smith as William "Will" Smith (24 episodes, 1991-1992)
 James Avery as Philip Banks (24 episodes, 1991-1992)
 Janet Hubert-Whitten as Vivian Banks (24 episodes, 1991-1992)
 Alfonso Ribeiro as Carlton Banks (24 episodes, 1991-1992)
 Karyn Parsons as Hilary Banks (24 episodes, 1991-1992)
 Tatyana M. Ali as Ashley Banks (24 episodes, 1991-1992)
 Joseph Marcell as Geoffrey Butler (24 episodes, 1991-1992)

Guest cast
 DJ Jazzy Jeff as Jazz (3 episodes, 1991-1992)
 Vernee Watson-Johnson as Viola Smith (3 episodes, 1991-1992)
 Jenifer Lewis as Aunt Helen (3 episodes, 1991-1992)
 Tim Haldeman as Bailiff/Security Guard (2 episodes, 1991)
 Milton Berle as Max Jakey (1 episode, 1992)
 Zsa Zsa Gabor as Sonya Lamor (1 episode, 1991)
 Nancy Giles as Madie (1 episode, 1992)
 John Beradino as Doctor Harding (1 episode, 1992)
 Tisha Campbell as Kathleen (1 episode, 1991)
 Marge Kotlisky as Mrs. DeWinter (1 episode, 1992)
 Perry Moore as Tyriq (3 episodes, 1991-1992)
 Joan McMurtrey as Barbara Simon (1 episode, 1992)
 Tina Lifford as Mrs. Hoover (1 episode, 1991)

References

External links 
 
 

1991 American television seasons
1992 American television seasons
The Fresh Prince of Bel-Air seasons